Complaining is a form of communication that expresses annoyance or unhappiness. It may serve a range of purposes, including connecting with others who feel similarly displeased, reinforcing a sense of self, or a cathartic expression of personal emotion. Complaining may be a method of notification, especially in the context of a consumer of goods or services, that one party has failed to satisfy normal standards, and is expected to rectify a perceived grievance, such as replacing a defective item. 

Complaining may be formalized into an organizational system of filing a written grievance as part of a dispute resolution process. Alternatively, it may be a purely informal process among friends or acquaintances that allows for the expression and validation of some personal perspective, often referred to as venting. There is some evidence to suggest that complaining may be harmful for physical or mental health by increasing stress levels.

The American proverb, the squeaky wheel gets the grease, is sometimes used to convey the idea that complaining about a problem is an effective means of spurring its resolution, although it has also been noted that there is no necessary correlation between stridency and merit, so that the problem that gets resolved due to complaints may not actually be the most pressing problem requiring resolution.

See also
 Complaint system
 Consumer complaint
 Negativity bias

References

External links
 
 

Emotions
Human communication